The Lord Protector: The Riddle of the Chosen is a 1996 fantasy film starring Patrick Cassidy and directed by Ryan Carroll. The film was released under the alternate title The Dark Mist.

Plot
In a medieval world The Lord Protector must save the Earth from destruction and solve The Riddle of the Chosen. The Lord Protector travels to the heart of a magical evil and sets the stage for the ultimate showdown between good and evil.

References

External links

1996 films
1996 fantasy films
Films set in the Middle Ages
American sword and sorcery films
1990s English-language films
1990s American films